Fulvio Caccia (born 10 January 1952, in Florence, Italy) is a contemporary Italian poet, novelist and essayist. He won the 1994 Prix du Gouverneur Général.

Biography 
Fulvio Caccia graduated from l'Université du Québec à Montréal in 1979. He lives in Paris.

Works
Irpinia, (Guernica, 1983)
Scirocco (Triptyque, 1985)
Aknos, (Guernica, 1994, Prix du Gouverneur-général du Canada) 
La chasse spirituelle, (le Noroît, 2005)
Golden Eighties, un recueil de nouvelles (Montréal, Balzac 1994) 
 La république métis (Balzac en 1997)
La ligne gothique (Tryptique, 2004)
La coïncidence (2005) 
Le secret, publié à l’automne 2006 
Bruno Ramirez et Lamberto Tassinari La transculture et viceversa (Triptyque, Montréal  2010)
 Italie et Autres Voyages (le Noroît, Montréal / Bruno Doucey, Paris 2010)

References

External links

1952 births
Living people
21st-century Italian novelists
20th-century Italian novelists
21st-century Italian male writers
20th-century Italian male writers
Governor General's Award-winning poets
Italian essayists
Male essayists
Italian male short story writers
Italian poets
Writers from Quebec
20th-century Italian short story writers
21st-century Italian short story writers
20th-century essayists
21st-century essayists
Italian male non-fiction writers